Joven may refer to:

Tequila
 Joven (tequila), a type of tequila

Given names
 Joven Clarke (born 1983), Australian former rugby league footballer
Joven Alba, participated in Billiards and snooker at the 2005 Southeast Asian Games
Joven Bustamante, participated in 2007 WPA Men's World Nine-ball Championship
Joven Bedic, participated in 2011 PFF National Men's U-23 Championship
Joven Benitez,  participated in 2015 UFL Cup
Joven E. Rola, actor in The Eve of St. Mark
Joven Yuson, in Manila local elections, 2010

Surname
Chris Joven, participated in 2011–12 UCI Asia Tour
Ceferino Jóven, Governor of Pampanga
Francis Joven, participated in Boxing at the 2006 Asian Games – Men's 69 kg

See also 
 
Jovon, given name
Jovan (given name)

es:Joven